Harlan York (born December 5, 1969) is a Newark, New Jersey attorney, regarded as one of the leading immigration lawyers in the United States.

Career
Harlan York is an author, teacher, and frequently cited expert on matters regarding immigration law in the United States. Mr. York was the first attorney in New Jersey to win "Immigration Lawyer of the Year" from Best Lawyers, and is a former Immigration Chair with the New Jersey State Bar Association, and Former Co-Chair of the New York State Bar Association CFLS Committee on Immigration. Mr York was also named to the "Furthered 40," a list of the 40 lawyers, accountants, and entrepreneurs who have furthered the educations of their professions. Harlan York currently serves on the American Immigration Lawyers Association (AILA) National Practice Management Committee, as well as moderating panels for the New Jersey Institute for Continuing Legal Education, on the topics of "Protecting Immigrant Victims of Violence " and "Immigration and Crime." His first book, Three Degrees of Law, was published April 1, 2015, and was called a "valuable resource for all professionals" by 201 Magazine.

Clients 
York's immigration clients range from high tech professionals and PhDs to manual laborers, skilled workers, and victims of violence. Some of his higher profile clients include world-renowned chess player Garry Kasparov, and Olympic gold medalist Peter Rono. York has also worked with a number of high-profile musicians including Grammy-nominated La India, and rocker Joe Lynn Turner.

Media and lectures 
As an expert on immigration law, York's insight is sought by the media as well as his professional colleagues. Most recently York has appeared on Bloomberg Law Radio, and the New Jersey Journal.. The bilingual attorney has appeared on national television on CBS This Morning with Charlie Rose  and Primer Impacto on Univision, and has spoken about a host of immigration issues on Telemundo, NBC, and PBS. York often lectures on immigration law at institutions such as Columbia Law School, New York Law School,  Rutgers Law School  and other sites. He is a well-known speaker at the New Jersey State Bar Foundation and Federal Bar Association events. He was a judge at the American Mock Trial Tournament at Yale University. York's highly rated Lawline.com lecture series is available for attorneys, law students and the public to study online.

Harlan York and Associates 
Harlan York is the founder of Harlan York and Associates, an internationally recognized immigration law firm with clients worldwide. Harlan York and Associates has received a Tier One ranking by U.S. News & World Report Best Law Firms.  The firm's attorneys appear regularly at Immigration Courts and Immigration Service offices across the United States.

Harlan York and Associates handles all immigration matters, including:

 Deportation and Detention
 Federal Appeals
 Visa Petitions
 Permanent Residence Applications
 Citizenship
 Employment and Family-Based Immigration
 Deferred Action
 All Applications for Victims of Violence
 Immigration for same-sex couples

Education
York attended Choate Rosemary Hall and The State University of New York at Albany, both on scholarship. He was admitted to the New Jersey and Connecticut State Bars as well as the United States Supreme Court, after earning his Juris Doctor from the Tulane University School of Law.

His work was featured by Choate Rosemary Hall in its alumni magazine in 2012.

York studied Kyokushin Karate as a youth, competed in amateur wrestling as a teenager and trained in Brazilian Jiu-Jitsu as an adult. He was certified as a women's self-defense instructor by Steve Kardian, internationally regarded security and safety expert.

York resides in Bergen County, New Jersey, with his wife, daughter and son.

References

Living people
New York (state) lawyers
Lawyers from New York City
Tulane University Law School alumni
New Jersey lawyers
1969 births
Immigration lawyers